is a Japanese visual kei metal band initially formed in May 2013 but restarted in February 2015. The group are an independent band on the label DPR Japan, consisting of members Ricko, Sena, the main songwriter of the songs, Boogie and Zyean. They have released 7 albums and 6 singles so far. It was ranked at the 12 position on the JRock News's top 15 visual kei and Japanese rock artists of 2019. Jiluka is described as "".

Career

Early years (2013 – 2016) 
Jiluka was originally formed in February 2013 by Ricko, Sena, Boogie and JaiL, debuting on May 6, 2013. However, JaiL announced in June that they would leave the band after a final show on December 21, 2013, causing a break in the group activities. The band restarted in 2015 with a new drummer, Zyean, releasing their debut single "Screamer" and then, on April 8, the EP Brave Agonistic Letters Under Segregation. On April 20, 2016, they released the single "Faizh" and performed their first solo concert on May 21 in Ikebukuro. The second single, "Lluvia", was released on November 11.

First full album and Mad Pit Tour (2017 – present) 
In 2017 they released their third EP, titled Xenomorphic, on June 28. The limited single "Hellraiser" was released for exclusive purchase at the May 20, 2018 concert at Tsutaya-O West. Metamorphose, the band's first full-length album, was released on September 12, 2018, and reached number eight on the Oricon Indies Albums charts. On December 16, the group performed in Metal Square vol. 4 festival in Shibuya, with other bands like Dimlim, Nocturnal Bloodlust and Deviloof.

In 2019, they sponsored the Mad Pit Tour 2019 and embarked on it with other bands such as Deviloof, Dexcore and Victim of Deception. On May 29, they released a cover album titled Polyhedron, containing covers of songs by Do As Infinity, Joe Yellow, Hatsune Miku, among others. Jiluka participated in a collaboration with the band breakin' holiday and on August 3, the two groups performed together and released an album titled B'H⇄JLK, in which Juri, lead singer of breakin' holiday, sings Jiluka's "Twisted Pain" and Ricko sings "Lilith" by breakin' holiday. The disc was limited to purchase on the day of the show. On November 13, the greatest hits album Xanadu was released along with a new version of the music video for "Screamer" from the debut EP Brave Agonistic Letters Under Segregation. The album also included a new song, "Elice in Slow Motion".

In February 2020, they performed at Tsutaya-O West, celebrating the band's 5-year career. From June to July, they would sponsor the Mad Pit Tour 2020, however it was completely canceled due to the COVID-19 pandemic. On October 3 they embarked on another national tour, but this time with limited audience due to the pandemic, which ended on November 29 in Shibuya. The tour was in promotion of the new EP, Xtopia, released on October 14. From August 30 to September 12, 2020, they embarked on tour together with Leetspeak Monsters. Jiluka performed a free online show available worldwide from Twitch hosted by Chaotic Harmony store on February 21, 2021.

Musical style 
Jiluka's musicality is presented as metal, mostly metalcore and visual kei, Describing "Twisted Pain", Jrock News claimed that the song features "heavy drums with double pedals, fancy guitar solo and fry scream vocals". Barks stated that "the band's technical and intense sound draws attention" and commenting about "Divine Error", describes it as "a heavy melody". The band also incorporate hip hop and EDM elements into their music.

Influences 
Jiluka cites as their main influence, among all the members, the Japanese band X Japan. Sena mentions as some of his more specific influences the band Kansas, classical music and the English band Rixton. He says he used to listen to hip-hop, until a friend urged him to listen to X Japan's "Kurenai"; he became a guitarist inspired by hide and Pata. Ricko says that he likes rap, being a fan of Linkin Park and that he also used to listen to L'Arc-en-Ciel. Boogie claims he listens to a bit of everything, like Luna Sea and Korn, but Slipknot brought him into metal. Zyean says he listens to a lot of metal bands, like Metallica, Bullet for My Valentine, Rhapsody of Fire, Behemoth, among many others.

All members claim that at the beginning of their musical careers they were from different positions. Ricko used to play guitar but the band he was part of didn't have a vocalist, and despite being insecure, he started to sing. Even though Sena's influences encouraged him to play guitar, he initially played drums, as stated by himself. Zyean started listening to death metal and other types of extreme metal when he was a student. He was a self-taught vocalist who also played guitar and bass: "To be honest, I didn't want to play drums back then." In another interview, he claimed that a drummer classmate convinced him to play. Like Ricko, Boogie said that a bass player was missing on the band that he was invited to play.

Members 
 Ricko (リコ) - vocals (2013 – present)
 Sena (セナ) - guitar  (2013 – present)
 Boogie (ブギー) - bass guitar  (2013 – present)
 Zyean (ジェーン) - drums  (2015 – present)

Former members 
 JaiL - drums (2013)

Discography

Albums 
 Brave Agonistic Letters Under Segregation (April 8, 2015)
  Destrieb (August 5, 2015)
 Xenomorphic (June 28, 2017) (Oricon Albums Chart: 257)
 Metamorphose (September 12, 2018) (Oricon Albums Chart: 67; Indies Albums: 8)
 Polyhedron (May 29, 2019) (Oricon Albums Chart: 102)
 Xanadu (November 13, 2019) (Oricon Albums Chart: 83)
 Xtopia (October 14, 2020) (Oricon Albums Chart: 88)
 IDOLA (September 15, 2021)

References

Musical quartets
Visual kei musical groups
Musical groups reestablished in 2015
Musical groups established in 2013
Metalcore musical groups
Japanese musical groups